Pseudocollinella is a genus of flies belonging to the family Lesser Dung flies.

Species
P. abhorrens (Roháček, 1990)
P. aquilifrons Marshall in Marshall & Smith, 1993
P. arctopellucida Marshall in Marshall & Smith, 1993
P. attractans Marshall in Marshall & Smith, 1993
P. boreosciaspidis Marshall in Marshall & Smith, 1993
P. caelobata (Spuler, 1924)
P. charlottensis Marshall in Marshall & Smith, 1993
P. difficilis (Richards, 1973)
P. flavilabris (Hackman, 1968)
P. grandis (Spuler, 1924)
P. hirsutipellucida Marshall in Marshall & Smith, 1993
P. humida (Haliday, 1836)
P. jorlii (Carles-Tolrá, 1990)
P. nasalis (Richards, 1973)
P. ochrea (Papp, 1974)
P. parapellucida Marshall in Marshall & Smith, 1993
P. parasciaspidis Marshall in Marshall & Smith, 1993
P. pellucida (Spuler, 1924)
P. sciaspidis (Spuler, 1924)
P. septentrionalis (Stenhammar, 1855)
P. tunisica (Papp, 1977)
P. utapellucida Marshall in Marshall & Smith, 1993

References

Sphaeroceridae
Diptera of Europe
Diptera of Africa
Diptera of Asia
Diptera of North America
Diptera of Australasia
Taxa named by Oswald Duda
Brachycera genera